Manali may refer to:

Places in India
 Manali, Himachal Pradesh, 
 Manali, Chennai, a locality of Chennai
 Manali New Town, a locality of Chennai
 Manali, Gummidipoondi, a village in Tamil Nadu
 Manali River, a river in Kerala

People 
 Manali Dey, a Bengali actress..
 Manali Dakshini (1997), a Maharashtrian cricketer
 Manali Jagtap (1978), political and fine artist

Other
 Manali Petrochemical